Ivan Nikolayevich Kuznetsov (7 June 1909 —  23 August 1976) was a Russian actor. He appeared in more than thirty films from 1936 to 1976.

Selected filmography

References

External links 

1909 births
Actors from Saratov
1976 deaths
Soviet male film actors
Honored Artists of the RSFSR
Communist Party of the Soviet Union members
Burials at Vagankovo Cemetery